Babu Gogineni (born Rajaji Ramanadh in 1968) is an Indian Humanist, rationalist, and human rights activist, who served as Executive Director of the International Humanist and Ethical Union (IHEU).

Gogineni is the founder of, South Asian  Humanist Association and Indian Humanists. He is also the founder and owner of Skillguru, a training organization and private business.

In his activism, Gogineni campaigns against established privilege and abuse of rights done in the name of religion. During his time with the IHEU, he led IHEU's worldwide campaigns for the protection of Bangladeshi writer Taslima Nasreen, bringing Pakistani freethinker Younus Shaikh to safety in Europe. In India, he successfully led the campaign for rehabilitation and protecting the rights of Sambhavi, a child who was claimed as a reincarnation of a Buddhist goddess.

In 2003, Gogineni was one of the signatories to the Humanist Manifesto. He also identifies himself as a Bright. Gogineni writes in English, French and Telugu. He was a columnist for Hyderabad-based daily newspaper Postnoon and wrote a column called "The Human Angle". He has also hosted a multi-language TV series called The Big Question with Babu Gogineni offering a Humanist perspective on science and civilization.

Gogineni travels domestically and internationally to spread humanism and awareness of social issues. He speaks on television on superstition, science, Humanism and human rights.

He appeared on the second season of the reality TV show Bigg Boss Telugu. He was eliminated from the show after 63 days on Aug 12, 2018.

Early life and activism
Gogineni , the son of Aruna Kumari (née Vegunta) of Eluru, West Godavari district, Andhra Pradesh and Gurubabu of Tenali, Guntur district, Andhra Pradesh was born in Hyderabad. At the age of 18, he became the youngest certified French language teacher in Hyderabad. He later graduated from Nizam College.

He served as Joint secretary of Indian Radical Humanist Association, Bombay between 1988-1996; Vice-President of the Indian Rationalist Association, Hyderabad between 1993-1996; Secretary General of Rationalist Association India, Hyderabad between 1995-1996, and was part of South Asian Humanist Network, Bombay between 1995-1996, before moving to the United Kingdom in 1997, where he continued his activism work with the International Humanist and Ethical Union.

IHEU career
Gogineni was appointed as Executive Director of the International Humanist and Ethical Union (IHEU) in 1997. He was associated with IHEU till 2015.

During his long association with IHEU, Gogineni implemented the IHEU's move to the United Kingdom, turned IHEU into a multi-lingual proactive campaigning organization, arranged IHEU's lobbying efforts at an international level by securing Special Consultative status at the United Nations, organized IHEU's first General Assembly (GA) in Africa, and conceptualized and founded the IHEU Centre for Bioethics at the UN in New York. He also helped organize IHEU's Congresses in Mumbai (1999), Amsterdam (2002) and Paris (2005), and its first GA in Africa (2004).

Positions held
 Executive Director, IHEU, from 1997 until 2015.

Keynotes, Lectures and Debates
Mexico National University's Primavera lecture on Globalization at the Anthropology Museum of Mexico City, 1999.
Hinduism and the Myth of Evolution at conference on Darwin, Humanism and Science sponsored by European Humanist Federation, British Humanist Association, and IHEU, 2009.
World Humanist Congress in Oxford, 2014.
Cambridge Union Society's Debate, Cambridge University, 2014.
The Human Angle lecture series (30+ lectures) in the US and the UK at MIT/Harvard University Humanist Hub, University of South Florida, Asian Rationalist Society Birmingham, South Asian Human Conference, North American Telugu Association (NATA) Conference, 2016.
Championing the Light of Reason at TEDx Hyderabad, 2016.

In media
 What is Religion? a two-episode series of The Big Question radio program broadcast by BBC World Service featured Gogineni, 2004.
 Superstition Kills, a documentary about superstition in India, made by Henrik Thomé features Gogineni, 2009.
 The Big Question with Babu Gogineni, a TV series hosted by Gogineni on science and civilization, 2015.
 Open Heart With RK, Season 2, ABN Andhra Jyothi, 2015.

References

External links
Superstition kills, a documentary about superstitions in India featuring Babu Gogineni
Championing the Light of Reason, Babu Gogineni at TEDx Hyderabad

1968 births
Living people
Telugu people
Secular humanists
Indian rationalists
Indian humanists
Indian atheism activists
Writers from Hyderabad, India
English-language writers from India
Asian writers in French
Telugu-language writers
Pondicherry University alumni
Bigg Boss (Telugu TV series) contestants